UGC 480 is a spiral galaxy located approximately 500 million light-years from the Sun in the constellation Andromeda. It was discovered on October 17, 1876 by Édouard Stephan, and is interacting with the galaxy PGC 2726.

See also 
 Spiral galaxy 
 List of NGC objects (1–1000)
 Andromeda (constellation)

References

External links 
 
 
 SEDS

0218
Spiral galaxies
Interacting galaxies
00480
002720
Astronomical objects discovered in 1876
Andromeda (constellation)
Discoveries by Édouard Stephan